Hello is a greeting in the English language.

Hello may also refer to:

Art, entertainment, and media

Films
 Hello (1999 film), a Tamil film directed by Selva Bharathy
 Hello (2007 film), a Malayalam film
 Hello (2008 film), a Bollywood thriller film
 Hello (2011 film), a Ugandan short film
 Hello (2017 film), a Telugu film

Television 
 "Hello", an episode of The Good Doctor
 "Hell-O" (Glee), a 2010 episode of Glee

Music

Artists
 Hello (band), British glam rock band

Albums 
 Hello (After Edmund album), 2008
 Hello (The Capes album), 2005
 Hello (Half Japanese album), 2001
 Hello (Hedley album), 2015
 Hello (Poe album), 1995
 Hello (Cho Yong-pil album), 2013
 Hello! (album), by Status Quo, 1973
 Hello...x, by Tristan Prettyman, 2008
 Hello EP, by The Minus 5, 1995
 Hello (Karmin EP), 2012
 Hello (Mamamoo EP), 2014
 Hello (Joy EP), 2021
 Hell-O, an album by Gwar, 1988
 Hello, repackaged version of Lucifer (Shinee album), 2010
 Hello, an album by Joy, 1986
 Hello, an EP by Tatyana Ali, 2014

Songs 
 "Hello" (Adele song), 2015
 "Hello" (Aya Ueto song), 2003
 "Hello" (The Beloved song), 1990
 "Hello" (The Cat Empire song), 2003
 "Hello" (Hedley song), 2015
 "Hello" (Ice Cube song), 2001
 "Hello!" (Joe Inoue song), 2008
 "Hello" (Joy song), 2021
 "Hello" (Karmin song), 2011
 "Hello" (Kelly Clarkson song), 2011
 "Hello" (Lionel Richie song), 1984
 "Hello" (Martin Solveig and Dragonette song), 2010
 "Hello" (Masaharu Fukuyama song), 1995
 "Hello" (Mohombi song), Melodifestivalen 2019 song
 "Hello" (Pop Smoke song), 2021
 "Hello" (Poe song), 1996
 "Hello" (The Potbelleez song), 2011
 "Hello" (Stafford Brothers song), featuring Lil Wayne and Christina Milian, 2013
 "Hello (Follow Your Own Star)", by Christina Aguilera, 2004
 "Hello (I Love You)", by Roger Waters, 2007
 "Hello (Paradise Kiss)", by Yui, 2011
 "Hello (Turn Your Radio On)", by Shakespears Sister (1991), also covered by Queensberry
 "Hello! (Good to Be Back)", by Scooter, 2005
 "Hello", by Above & Beyond from the album Acoustic II, 2016
 "Hello", by Baby Chaos from the album Love Your Self Abuse, 1996
 "Hello", by Beyoncé Knowles from the album I Am... Sasha Fierce, 2008
 "Hello", by Blackfield, 2003
 "Hello", by Candîce Hillebrand, 2003
 "Hello", by Cody Simpson from the album Paradise, 2012
 “Hello”, by Dan Zanes and Friends ft. Barbara Brousal from Rocket Ship Beach, 2000
 "Hello", by Eminem from the album Relapse, 2009
 "Hello", by Erykah Badu from the album But You Caint Use My Phone, 2015
 "Hello", by Evanescence from the album Fallen, 2003
 "Hello", by J. Cole from the album 2014 Forest Hills Drive, 2014
 "Hello", by James from the album Millionaires, 1999
 "Hello", by Jimmy Harnen from the album Can't Fight the Midnight, 1989
 "Hello", by Joy from the album Hello, 1986
 "Hello", by Jung Yong-hwa and Sunwoo Jung-a from the collaboration "Empathy", 2016
 "Hello", by LL Cool J from the album G.O.A.T., 2000
 "Hello", by Oasis from the album (What's the Story) Morning Glory?, 1995
 "Hello", by Prince, included as a B-side of "Pop Life", 1985
 "Hello", by Prism from the album See Forever Eyes, 1978
 "Hello", by Rock Goddess from the album Young and Free, 1987
 "Hello", by Shinee from the album Lucifer, 2010
 "Hello", by T.I. from the album King, 2006
 "Hello", by T.I. from the album Trouble Man: Heavy Is the Head, 2012
 "Hello", by Ty Dolla Sign from the album Campaign, 2016
 "Hello", by will.i.am from the album #willpower, 2013
 "Hello", by Zooey Deschanel from the album Trolls, 2016
 "Hello", from the musical The Book of Mormon, 2011

Other media
 Hello! (magazine), a British celebrity magazine
 Hello (web series), a 2017 Indian web series

Computing and technology
 Hello, a discontinued software program for Picasa
 Hello, a discontinued WebRTC program for Firefox
 Hello.jpg, a notorious image featured on shock site Goatse.cx
 Hello (company), a sleep-tracking company
 Hello (social network), a social networking service founded by Orkut Büyükkökten
 Hello world program, a software programming demonstration
 Windows Hello, a feature of Microsoft Windows 10.

Other uses
 Ernest Hello (1828–1885), French critic
 Hello (airline), a Swiss charter airline
 Hello convention, bidding convention in bridge

See also
 Hello Hello (disambiguation)
 Hallo (disambiguation)
 HELO (disambiguation)
 Haro (character)